Mansya Kalan, a Gram panchayat, is in the district Hathras in India.

The village is mainly populated by Jats. 

In specifics, the global coordinates are 27°25'31.9"N 78°00'24.6"E.

Total living area: 147,975.52 m2 (1,592,795.27 ft²)
Total perimeter : 2.61 km (1.62 mi)

masor district road 102W passes through village mansya kalan
‘the gram panchayat of four main villages which are-
•mansya kalan
•mansya khurd
•nagla jagram
•kunjalpur’

Potatoes and wheat are the main crops of this area.

The postal code is 281306.

Villages in Hathras district